The 2017–18 Spartak Moscow season was the twenty-sixth successive season that the club played in the Russian Premier League, the highest tier of association football in Russia. Domestically Spartak Moscow were defending Premier League Champions, failing to defend their title and eventually finishing third, winning the Russian Super Cup and reached the semi-final of the Russian Cup where they were defeated by eventual winners FC Tosno. In Europe Spartak Moscow finished third in their UEFA Champions League group behind Liverpool and Sevilla, transferring to the UEFA Europa League where they were knocked out at the Round of 32 stage by Athletic Bilbao.

Squad

Out on loan

Left club during season

Transfers

In

Loans in

Out

Loans out

Released

Competitions

Super Cup

Russian Premier League

Results by round

Matches

League table

Russian Cup

UEFA Champions League

Group stage

UEFA Europa League

Knockout phase

Squad Statistics

Appearances and goals

|-
|colspan="14"|Players away from the club on loan:

|-
|colspan="14"|Players who left Spartak Moscow during the season:

|}

Goal Scorers

Clean sheets

Disciplinary Record

References

FC Spartak Moscow seasons
Spartak Moscow
Spartak Moscow